The Paps of Jura are three mountains on the western side of the island of Jura, in the Inner Hebrides of Scotland.

They are steep-sided quartzite hills with distinctive conical shapes resembling breasts. The word pap is an ancient word of Old Norse origin for the breast. The Paps are conspicuous hills that dominate the island landscape as well as the landscape of the surrounding area. They can be seen from the Mull of Kintyre and, on a clear day, Skye, Northern Ireland, and Malin Head.

One of the simplest routes of ascent starts from Craighouse. The route of the annual Isle of Jura Fell Race includes all three Paps and four other hills.

When viewed from Kintraw Argyll the midwinter sun briefly shines between two of the paps just before setting.

These hills were the subject of William McTaggart's 1902 painting The Paps of Jura, now displayed in the Kelvingrove Art Gallery and Museum.

Mountains
Beinn a' Chaolais (Gaelic: mountain of the kyle) is the lowest of the Paps, reaching .

See also
 List of mountains in Scotland
 Maiden Paps (disambiguation)

References

External links

Stuart McHardy, The Goddess in the Landscape of Scotland

 
Mountains and hills of the Scottish islands
Mountains and hills of Argyll and Bute
Jura, Scotland
Mountain ranges of Scotland